John Sergeant may refer to:

 John Sergeant (journalist) (born 1944), English journalist and broadcaster
 John Sergeant (missionary) (1710-1749), American missionary to the Mahicans of Stockbridge
 John Sergeant (politician) (1779–1852), American politician
 John Sergeant (priest) (1623–1707/10), Roman Catholic priest and writer

See also 
 John Sargent (disambiguation)